Luis Vidal may refer to:

 Luis Vidal (footballer, born 1916) (1916-1999), Chilean football defender and manager
 Luis Vidal (footballer, born 1952) (born 1952), Chilean football defender
 Luis Vidal (architect) (born 1969), Spanish architect